Chrysomantis girardi is a species of praying mantis found in Côte d'Ivoire and Guinea.

See also
List of mantis genera and species

References

G
Mantodea of Africa
Insects of West Africa
Insects described in 1968